California's 78th State Assembly district is one of 80 California State Assembly districts. It is currently represented by Democrat Chris Ward of San Diego.

District profile 
The district takes in a stretch of San Diego County's coast from Solana Beach to the Mexican border, including part of San Diego Bay and coastal San Diego. It comprises a variety of communities, including Downtown San Diego, beachfront neighborhoods, UC San Diego, and a military base.

San Diego County – 14.9%
 Coronado
 Del Mar
 Imperial Beach
 San Diego – 30.6%
 Solana Beach

Election results from statewide races

List of Assembly Members 
Due to redistricting, the 78th district has been moved around different parts of the state. The current iteration resulted from the 2011 redistricting by the California Citizens Redistricting Commission.

Election results 1992 - present

2020

2018

2016

2014

2012

2010

2008

2006

2004

2002

2000

1998

1996

1994

1992

See also 
 California State Assembly
 California State Assembly districts
 Districts in California

References

External links 
 District map from the California Citizens Redistricting Commission

78
Government of San Diego County, California
Government of San Diego
Coronado, California
Del Mar, California
Imperial Beach, California
La Jolla, San Diego
Ocean Beach, San Diego
Solana Beach, California